Mount Spring-Rice is located on the border of Alberta and British Columbia, south of Thompson Pass. It was named in 1918 by Arthur O. Wheeler after the British diplomat, Sir Cecil Spring Rice.

See also
 List of peaks on the British Columbia–Alberta border
 List of mountains in the Canadian Rockies

References

Three-thousanders of Alberta
Three-thousanders of British Columbia
Canadian Rockies
Mountains of Banff National Park